Ezechiel Banzuzi (born 16 February 2005) is a Dutch footballer who currently plays as a midfielder for NAC Breda.

Club career
Banzuzi joined NAC Breda at the age of eleven; rising through the youth ranks and eventually making his debut on 26 October 2021 in a cup game against VVV-Venlo.

International career
Banzuzi has represented The Netherlands at under-17 level. He is of Congolese descent.

Career statistics

Club

Notes

References

2005 births
Living people
Dutch footballers
Netherlands youth international footballers
Dutch people of Democratic Republic of the Congo descent
Association football midfielders
NAC Breda players
Eerste Divisie players